Vernonia angustifolia is a species of flowering plant in the family Asteraceae, native to the southeastern United States (Alabama, Florida, Georgia, Louisiana, Mississippi, North Carolina and South Carolina). It was first described by André Michaux in 1803.

References

angustifolia
Flora of the Southeastern United States
Plants described in 1803
Flora without expected TNC conservation status